Alexander Claude Forster Boulton (1862 – 12 March 1949) was a British Liberal Party politician whose career in the House of Commons lasted barely four years.

He was elected at the 1906 general election as Member of Parliament for the Ramsey division of Huntingdonshire, a constituency which had been held by Conservatives since its creation in 1885. 

He was defeated at the January 1910 general election;

He was unsuccessful when he stood again in December 1910.

Boulton did not stand again until the 1923 general election, when he fought the Conservative-held New Forest and Christchurch division of Hampshire.  The seat had not been contested in either 1918 or 1922, and in a straight contest with the sitting Conservative MP, Boulton won 46% of the votes. Boulton stood again at the 1924 general election, when a Labour candidate also contested the seat.  The Conservative vote increased, and Boulton's second-placed vote was less than half the Tory total. He did not stand for Parliament again.

References

External links 
 

1852 births
1949 deaths
Liberal Party (UK) MPs for English constituencies
UK MPs 1906–1910